The 2021 PSDB presidential primary was held on 21 and 27 November 2021 to elect the Brazilian Social Democracy Party presidential nominee.

Background

2018 Brazilian general election 

In 2018, PSDB choose Geraldo Alckmin as its presidential candidate and formed the alliance "To unite Brazil", composed of PSDB, DEM, PP, PR, PRB, Solidariedade, PTB, PSD and PPS.  In 2018, PSDB had its worst presidential election result ever, getting only 5% of the votes and losing only half of their deputies. In the runoff, PSDB declared neutrality and elected 3 governors, their smallest amount since 1990.

Bolsonaro's Administration 
In 2019, PSDB declared itself to be an independent party, criticizing the more authoritarian agenda of Bolsonaro but endorsing most of the economic agenda. They were important for the passing of the pension reform.

In 2020, Jair Bolsonaro nominated Rogério Marinho, a PSDB politician, as Minister of Regional Development. While PSDB was initially supportive of the nomination, Rogério Marinho later had to leave the party due to PSDB wanting to distance themselves from Bolsonaro.

During the COVID-19 pandemic in Brazil, PSDB became more overtly against Bolsonaro. João Doria, governor of São Paulo, and Eduardo Leite, governor of Rio Grande do Sul, ordered social distancing and lockdown. João Doria notoriously bought CoronaVac and São Paulo became the first state to start the vaccination.

In 2021, due to the democratic backsliding in Brazil, PSDB voted to become an opposition party and to open impeachment procedures against Bolsonaro. João Doria tried to be elected party president and become the presumptive PSDB candidate, but after criticism of power-grabbing, it was decided that PSDB would have a primary to elect its presidential candidate.

Electoral system 
For the 2021 presidential primary, PSDB decided to adopt a system where voters being part of different electoral colleges depending on their party position. There are 4 electoral colleges each with equal value:

1- Registered members without elected position;

2- Mayors and deputy mayors;

3- City councilors and state deputies;

4- Governors, Vice Governors, Senators, federal deputies and members of the National Executive;

If a candidate gets more than 50% of the votes in the first round, he wins, but if no candidate, there is a runoff election between the two most voted candidates.

Doria proposed a universal system that every registered member had equal vote, but the PSDB executive rejected the proposal.

Candidates

Campaign

João Doria 
João Doria announced his presidential campaign in June 15. 

In the campaign declared support of the privatization of Petrobras and Banco do Brasil, but came out against the privatization of Caixa Econômica Federal. He said that, if he became the PSDB presidential nominee, he would select a woman as running mate.

Eduardo Leite 
Eduardo Leite said that he would be a candidate in the PSDB primaries in May.

His main economic advisor is Aod Cunha, a former Rio Grande do Sul finance secretary, his main points are a plan to tackle inequality, free market reforms, fiscal responsibility and environment protection.

Tasso Jereissati 
In April 25, Tasso announced his intention to join the PSDB presidential primary. On September 28, 2021, he withdrew from participating in the primaries and decided to publicly support Leite's name.

Arthur Virgílio Neto 
Vírgilio was the first candidate to announce his intention to run in the PSDB presidential primary.

Endorsements

Results

References 

Primary elections in Brazil
2021 political party leadership elections